The National Theatre of Panama (Spanish: Teatro Nacional de Panamá) is located in the old city of Panama, next to the church of San Francisco and the Plaza Bolívar. Its construction was ordered by Act 52 of 1904.

The National Theatre is part of a cross-shaped building. Ceiling frescos were done by famed Panamanian Robert Lewis. The other part is occupied by National Palace. The theater was designed by Italian architect Genaro Ruggieri, with a style of Italian operetta theater, and opened on October 1, 1908.

References

Panama
Buildings and structures in Panama City
Theatres completed in 1908
Theatres in Panama
Opera houses in Panama
Tourist attractions in Panama City
Music venues completed in 1908
1908 establishments in Panama